The 1999 NAIA World Series was the 43rd annual tournament hosted by the National Association of Intercollegiate Athletics to determine the national champion of baseball among its member colleges and universities in the United States and Canada.

The tournament was played, for the one and only time, at Roger Dean Stadium in Jupiter, Florida.

Lewis–Clark State (57–14) defeated defending champions Albertson (50–19) in the second game of a two-game championship series, 7–2, to win the Warriors' tenth NAIA World Series and first since 1996.

Lewis–Clark State outfielder, and future major leaguer, Jason Ellison was named tournament MVP.

Bracket

Preliminary bracket

Championship bracket

See also
 1999 NCAA Division I baseball tournament
 1999 NCAA Division II baseball tournament
 1999 NCAA Division III baseball tournament
 1999 NAIA Softball World Series

References

NAIA World Series
NAIA World Series
NAIA World Series
NAIA World Series